The Llanos (Spanish Los Llanos, "The Plains") is a vast tropical grassland plain situated to the east of the Andes in Colombia and Venezuela, in northwestern South America. It is an ecoregion of the tropical and subtropical grasslands, savannas, and shrublands biome.

Geography
The Llanos occupy a lowland that extends mostly east and west. The Llanos are bounded on the west and northwest by the Andes, and on the north by the Venezuelan Coastal Range. The Guiana Highlands are to the southeast, and the Negro-Branco moist forests are to the southwest. To the east the Orinoco wetlands and Orinoco Delta swamp forests occupy the Orinoco Delta.

The Llanos' main river is the Orinoco, which runs from west to east through the ecoregion and forms part of the border between Colombia and Venezuela. The Orinoco is the major river system of Venezuela.

Climate
The ecoregion has a tropical savanna climate that grades into a tropical monsoon climate in the Colombian Llanos. Rainfall is highly seasonal, with a rainy season from April to November, and a dry season between December and March. The wettest months are typically June and July.

Flora
The plant communities in the Llanos include open grasslands, savannas with scattered trees or clumps of trees, and small areas of forest, typically gallery forests along rivers and streams. There are seasonally flooded grasslands and savannas (llano bajo) and grasslands and savannas that remain dry throughout the year (llano alto).

The llano alto grasslands and savannas are characterized by grasses and shrubs 30–100 cm high, forming tussocks 10 to 30 cm apart. Soils are typically sandy and nutrient-poor. Llano alto covers approximately two-thirds of the Venezuelan llanos, and is also widespread in the Colombian llanos. Grasses of genus Trachypogon are predominant, and species include Trachypogon plumosus, T. vestitus, Axonopus canescens, A. anceps, Andropogon selloanus, Aristida spp., Leptocoryphium lanatum, Paspalum carinatum, Sporobolus indicus, and S. cubensis, and sedges in the genera Rhynchospora and Bulbostylis. Shrubs and herbs are most commonly legumes in the genera Mimosa, Cassia, Desmodium, Eriosema, Galactia, Indigofera, Phaseolus, Stylosanthes, Tephrosia, and Zornia. The trees manteco (Byrsonima crassifolia),  chaparro (Curatella americana), and alcornoque (Bowdichia virgilioides) are the most common, growing either as scattered trees or in woodland patches known as matas which range in area from 12 meters in diameter up to a hectare.

During the rainy season from May to October, parts of the Llanos can flood up to a meter. This turns some savannass and grasslands into temporary wetlands, comparable to the Pantanal of central South America. This flooding also creates habitat for water birds and other wildlife. These seasonally flooded grasslands and savannas, known as llano bajo, typically have richer soils. They are characterized by the grass Paspalum fasciculatum. Trees include the palm Copernicia tectorum and gallery forest species.

Gallery forests include evergreen seasonally flooded forests, and semi-deciduous forests on higher ground. Morichales are seasonally flooded forests characterized by the moriche palm (Mauritia flexuosa). Vegas are seasonally flooded evergreen forests found along the Orinoco and its tributaries. Trees form a canopy 8 to 20 meters high, and include Inga spp., Combretum frangulifolium, Gustavia augusta, Pterocarpus sp., Etaballia dubia, Spondias mombin, and Copaifera pubiflora.

Semi-deciduous forests occur above flood level, and form a canopy 12 to 15 meters high. Common trees include Tabebuia billbergii, Godmania aesculifolia, Cassia moschata, Spondias mombin, Copaifera pubiflora, Bourreria cumanensis, Cordia spp., Bursera simaruba, Cochlospermum vitifolium, Hura crepitans, and Acacia glomerosa.

"Matorrales" are deciduous and semi-deciduous shrublands 5 to 8 meters high which cover large areas in the central Venezuelan llanos, and may be a form of secondary vegetation in areas that were formerly dry deciduous forest. Typical shrubs are Bourreria cumanensis, Randia aculeata, Godmania aesculifolia, Pereskia guamacho, Prosopis spp., Xylosma benthamii, Erytroxylum sp., and Cereus hexagonus.

Fauna
Mammals of the grassland and savanna include white-tailed deer (Odocoileus virginianus), giant anteater (Myrmecophaga tridactyla), capybara (Hydrochoerus hydrochaeris), giant armadillo (Priodontes maximus), Eastern cottontail (Sylvilagus floridanus), Alston's cotton rat (Sigmodon alstoni), Hispid cotton rat (S. hispidus), Zygodontomys brevicauda, and Oecomys bicolor.

The gallery forests are home to more diverse large and medium-sized mammals, including collared peccary (Tayassu tajacu), white-lipped peccary (T. pecari), South American tapir (Tapirus terrestris), white-tailed deer,  red brocket (Mazama americana), wedge-capped capuchin (Cebus olivaceus), Venezuelan red howler (Alouatta seniculus), large rodents like the lowland paca (Cuniculus paca), agoutis (Dasyprocta spp.), and Brazilian porcupine (Coendou prehensilis), and large cats like the puma (Puma concolor), jaguar (Panthera onca), and ocelot (Leopardus pardalis). The endangered giant otter (Pteronura brasiliensis) lives along the Orinoco and its tributaries.

The Llanos long-nosed armadillo (Dasypus sabanicola) and the short-tailed opossum Monodelphis orinoci are endemic to the Llanos.

The Llanos' wetlands supports around 70 species of water birds, including the scarlet ibis. A large portion of the distribution of the sharp-tailed ibis (Cerbibis oxycerca) and white-bearded flycatcher (Phelpsia inornata) is in the Llanos.

Native reptiles include the Orinoco crocodile (Crocodylus intermedius), spectacled caiman (Caiman crocodilus), Green anaconda (Eunectes murinus), and Arrau turtle (Podocnemis expansa), which live in the ecoregion's wetlands.

Indigenous peoples
Indigenous peoples of the Llanos include the Guahibo in the western Llanos of Colombia and Venezuela, and the Yaruro in the eastern Llanos in Venezuela.

Cattle raising and farming
The primary economic activity in the Llanos since the Spanish colonial era is the herding of millions of cattle. An 1856 watercolor by Manuel María Paz depicts sparsely populated open grazing lands with cattle and palm trees. The term llanero ("plainsman") became synonymous with the cowhands that took care of the herds, and had some cultural similarities with the gauchos of the Pampas or the vaqueros of Spanish and Mexican Texas.

Decades of extensive cattle raising has altered the ecology of the Llanos. Grasslands and savannas are frequently burned to make them more suitable for grazing and eliminate trees and shrubs. Non-native grasses have been introduced for cattle fodder, including the African grass Melinis minutiflora, and now cover large areas.

Agriculture, particularly rice and maize, now cover extensive areas, including rice fields in former seasonal wetlands.

Oil and gas
In Los Llanos, the governments of Venezuela and Colombia had developed a strong oil and gas industry in the zones of Arauca, Casanare, Guárico, Anzoátegui, Apure and Monagas. The Orinoco Belt, entirely in Venezuelan territory, consists of large deposits of extra heavy crude (oil sands). The Orinoco belt oil sands are known to be one of the largest, behind that of the Athabasca Oil Sands in Alberta, Canada.

Protected areas
A 2017 assessment found that 105,323 km², or 28%, of the ecoregion, is in protected areas. Protected areas include Aguaro-Guariquito National Park (5,857.5 km²), Cinaruco-Capanaparo National Park (5,843.68 km²), Tortuga Arrau Reserve (98.56 km²), and Caño Guaritico Wildlife Refuge (93.0 km²) in Venezuela, and El Tuparro National Natural Park (5,549.08 km²) in Colombia.

Gallery

Cities situated in the Llanos

In Colombia
Acacías
Arauca, Arauca
Gaviotas
Maní, Casanare
Orocué
Paz de Ariporo
Puerto Carreño
Inírida
Puerto López, Meta
San José del Guaviare
Saravena
Tame
Villavicencio
Yopal
Fortul

In Venezuela
Acarigua
Araure
Barinas
Calabozo
Caripito
El Tigre
Guanare
Maturín
Puerto Ayacucho
Sabaneta
San Carlos
San Fernando de Apure
Tucupita
Valle de la Pascua

See also
 History of Colombia
 History of Venezuela

References

External links

 
 Dawn on the Plains Photo Feature, Havana Times, Oct 1, 2010.
 The llanos music
 The llanos of Colombia and Venezuela
 Los Llanos de Colombia

 
Tropical and subtropical grasslands, savannas, and shrublands
Plains of South America
Plains of Venezuela
Grasslands of Colombia
Grasslands of Venezuela
Geographical regions of Venezuela
Ecoregions of South America
Neotropical ecoregions
Geography of Portuguesa (state)